Zhu Yue may refer to:
 Fan Zhongyan, Chinese poet, politician, philosopher, writer and military strategist
 Zhu Yue (footballer), Chinese footballer